Joseph Simon may refer to:

 Joseph Simon (1712–1804), Jewish community leader in Pennsylvania, United States
 Joseph Simon (politician) (1851–1935), United States politician and attorney
 Joseph Simon (comics) (1913–2011), United States comic book writer, artist, editor, and publisher
 Joseph Simon (Monegasque politician) (1900–1968), three times president of the National Council (Monaco)
 Joseph T. Simon (1912–1976), Austrian jurist and resistance fighter, member of the Counterintelligence Corps
 Joseph Maria Anton Brassier de Saint-Simon-Vallade (1798–1872), Prussian diplomat; envoy to Italy of the North German Confederation

See also
 Joe Simon (disambiguation)
 Joseph Simons
 Joseph Simonson